Miniassegni (pl. of miniassegno ) were a type of notgeld that was circulated in Italy in the late 1970s. Miniassegni were used as replacement for change which had become very scarce. Before miniassegni appeared, widely used replacement for coins had been telephone tokens, candy or other small merchandise items, and - in some cities - public transport tickets.

History

The first miniassegni were issued on December 10, 1975, by Istituto Bancario San Paolo, with a face value of Lit.100, (about US$0.14 at 1983 exchange rates). Many banks soon followed by issuing miniassegni with face values of Lit.50, Lit.100, Lit.150, Lit.200, Lit.250, Lit.300 and Lit.350. Their name (mini-checks) indicated that they were cashier's checks (assegni in Italian), but smaller than normal.

To overcome the prohibition to issue currency (exclusive prerogative of the Bank of Italy), banks were printing actual bank drafts, made payable to various small entities and companies with their pre-printed endorsement. The checks were then treated as bearer securities, and exchanged by the public as if they were real currency.

At their peak, there existed 835 different types of miniassegni, issued by 42 banks, for a total estimated value of more than Lit.200 billion. Some banks issued "illustrated" series with distinctive designs. These issues, printed in limited quantities, were sold to collectors at a substantial markup. At some point, even department stores chimed in, printing goods-redeemable  gift certificates in small denominations.

Printing miniassegni was widely believed to be a boon for the issuers, which sold them to retailers, pressured by the dearth of small denomination coins. However, many cheques were never returned, either because they were destroyed by wear (which was substantial, due to the poor quality of the paper) or because they disappeared from circulation hoarded by collectors, or forgotten by their holders, which did not much care, due to their diminutive value.

The miniassegni disappeared at the end of 1978 when the Government Printing Office and Mint was finally able to overcome the lack of small change. The reason for the scarcity of coins was never clear, though various, mostly false, explanations were being given (e.g. that the value of the coins was substantially lower than that of the metal they contained; that Italian coins were being used as watch cases by Swiss watchmakers). Hans Magnus Enzensberger, in an essay written a few years after the fact, lists several explanations given at the time and traces one of the probable causes to a temporary technical inadequacy of the Italian Mint, caused by bureaucratic complications.

Issuers
Banks who issued miniassegni 1975 and 1978:

Literature 
 Alberto Gullino, Sergio Boasso: Catalogo euro-unificato dei Mini-Assegni. 368 S., Verlag Alfa Edizioni, Turin 2002, 
 Hans Magnus Enzensberger: Italienische Ausschweifungen. Die Münze, in: Ach Europa! Wahrnehmungen aus sieben Ländern. Mit einem Epilog aus dem Jahre 2006, Suhrkamp, Frankfurt am Main 1987, S. 86–102
 Adelmo Manna: I delitti contro la fede pubblica e l'economia pubblica. Wolters Kluwer, Mailand 2010, S. 99–100,

See also 

 Economy of Italy

Notes

External links 
 Auswahl von Miniassegni auf Banknote Museum, retrieved 10 October 2013
 Hans Magnus Enzensberger: Italienische Ausschweifungen, Kapitel III. Die Münze, in: Die Zeit, 16 March 1984

Obsolete Italian currencies
Numismatic terminology
1970s in Italy
Emergency money